Lorraine Anne Bowles (in marriage also known as Lorraine Ambrosio) is a Canadian curler.

In 2006, she was inducted into the Canadian Curling Hall of Fame together with all of the 1979 Lindsay Sparkes team.

Teams

References

External links
 

Living people
Canadian women curlers
Curlers from British Columbia
Canadian women's curling champions
Year of birth missing (living people)
20th-century Canadian women